James Phillip McCarten (born 8 November 1990 in Netherton, Merseyside) is an English semi-professional footballer who plays for Bootle.

Career
McCarten began his career as a youth player at Everton and was named Everton under-18's player of the year for the 2008–09 season. Academy manager Ray Hall described McCarten as "the type of player a young boy should look up to". In March 2010, he joined Football League Two side Accrington Stanley on a short-term loan deal, making one appearance during a 2–3 defeat to Grimsby Town.

Released by Everton on his return, McCarten signed for Welsh Premier League side Aberystwyth Town. He made a total of 55 appearances for the club.

On 8 February 2019, McCarten was loaned out from Warrington Town to Bamber Bridge to get back to full fitness after an injury.

On 20 March 2019, he then joined City of Liverpool FC on a dual registration.

References

External links

Welsh Premier profile

1990 births
People from the Metropolitan Borough of Sefton
Living people
Association football defenders
English footballers
Everton F.C. players
Accrington Stanley F.C. players
Aberystwyth Town F.C. players
Warrington Town F.C. players
Bamber Bridge F.C. players
City of Liverpool F.C. players
Bootle F.C. players
English Football League players
Northern Premier League players
Cymru Premier players